USS L-7 (SS-46) was an L-class submarine built for the United States Navy during the 1910s.

Description
The L-class boats designed by Lake Torpedo Boat (L-5 through L-8) were built to slightly different specifications from the other L boats, which were designed by Electric Boat, and are sometimes considered a separate L-5 class. They displaced  on the surface and  submerged. The L-class submarines had a crew of 28 officers and enlisted men.

For surface running, the boats were powered by two  diesel engines, each driving one propeller shaft. When submerged each propeller was driven by a  electric motor. They could reach  on the surface and  underwater.

The boats were armed with four 18 inch (450 mm)  torpedo tubes in the bow. They carried four reloads, for a total of eight torpedoes. The L-class submarines were also armed with a single 3"/50 caliber deck gun.

Construction and career
L-7s keel was laid down on 2 June 1914 by Craig Shipbuilding Company in Long Beach, California. L-7 was launched on 28 September 1916 sponsored by Mrs. William B. Forgarty, and commissioned on 7 December 1917. After shakedown, L-7 departed the West Coast on 20 April 1918, arriving Charleston, South Carolina, on 10 June. Patrolling off Charleston until 15 October, the submarine finally steamed for the waters of Europe to battle the U-boats. Arriving Ponta Delgada, Azores, early in November, she joined Submarine Division 6 for anti-submarine warfare operations. However, the Armistice with Germany of 11 November 1918 ended World War I, and L-7 sailed for home on 19 November.

Following stops at Caribbean Sea and Central American ports, the submarine arrived San Pedro, California, on 14 February 1919, completing one of the best long distance seagoing performances of America's youthful submarine force. From 1919 to 1922, she remained on the West Coast, experimenting with new torpedoes and undersea detection equipment. After a period of commission in ordinary early in 1922, L-7 was returned to full commission on 1 July and sailed for Hampton Roads, Virginia, the same month. She decommissioned there on 15 November 1922 and was sold on 21 December 1925 to M. Samuel and Sons for scrapping.

Notes

References

External links
 

United States L-class submarines
World War I submarines of the United States
Ships built in Los Angeles
1916 ships